Zhiping Township is a township in Chengkou County, Chongqing, China. , it administers Huimin Residential Community and the following four villages:
Yanwan Village
Xinsheng Village
Xinhong Village
Yanghe Village

References 

Township-level divisions of Chongqing
Chengkou County